The Bicău is a left tributary of the river Someș in Romania. It discharges into the Someș in Roșiori.

References

Rivers of Romania
Rivers of Satu Mare County